The 1982 New Zealand Māori rugby union tour of Wales and Spain was a series of eight matches played by the Māori All Blacks (then known as the New Zealand Māori team) in Wales in October and November 1982. The Māori played eight games of which they won four, lost three and drew one. Six of the games were played against Welsh club or county sides while the one was  played against the Wales national rugby union team, although Wales did not award full international caps for the match. The final match was played against Spain.

Matches 
Scores and results list NZ Māori's points tally first.

Touring party
Manager: Waka Nathan
Assistant Manager: Percy Erceg
Captain: Paul Quinn

References

1982 rugby union tours
1982
1982
1982 in New Zealand rugby union
1982–83 in Welsh rugby union
1982–83 in European rugby union
rugby union
Rugby union tours of Spain